CFC, cfc, or Cfc may stand for:

Science and technology 
 Chlorofluorocarbon, a class of chemical compounds
 Cardiofaciocutaneous Syndrome, a rare and serious genetic disorder
 Subpolar oceanic climate (Cfc in the Köppen climate classification), short, generally cool summers and long, mild winters with abundant precipitation year-round
 ColdFusion Components, objects or files used in ColdFusion application servers
 Carbon fibre composite, a composite carbon based material, used in fusion armour applications
 Consideration of future consequences, a personality trait
 Continuous function chart, sort of Function block diagram enabling to program both Boolean and analogue expressions; Often associated with Sequential function chart (SFC)
 Counterflow chiller, a type of heat exchanger.

Education 

Canadian Film Centre, an institution for advanced training in film, television and new media in Canada 
Central Florida Community College, a public state college in Ocala, Florida

Businesses and organizations 
Certificación Fonográfica Centroamericana, music certification organization
CFC (Indonesia) or California Fried Chicken, an Indonesia fast food chain
CfC Stanbic Holdings, now Stanbic Holdings plc, a financial institution based in Kenya
Computer Film Company, a London digital film special effects company
Chess Federation of Canada, Canada's national chess organization
Citizens for Conservation
Compass Family Center, San Francisco family shelter
Countrywide Financial Corporation, American residential mortgage banking and related businesses
Consumer Federation of California, a California-based, nonprofit consumer advocacy organization.
Common Fund for Commodities, an intergovernmental financial institution for supporting strongly commodity-dependent developing countries
Consumer Federation of California, a consumer advocacy organization
Centers for Change, precursor in New York of the International Workers Party
Chemins de fer de Corse, the railway system in Corsica, France

Politics, law, government, and finance 

Cash for clunkers program
Combined Federal Campaign, for charities to fundraise via payroll deductions from US Federal Government employees
Controlled foreign corporation, company owned or controlled primarily by taxpayers of a different jurisdiction
Consumption of fixed capital, accounting term for depreciation of fixed assets
Comisión Federal de Competencia, or Federal Competition Commission, an agency of the Mexican government
ROK/US Combined Forces Command
United States Court of Federal Claims, a United States court

Religion 

Carols for Choirs, a British collection of Christmas carol music books
Catechism for Filipino Catholics, Roman Catholic catechism for Filipinos
Champions for Christ, Every Nation Churches outreach to college and professional sportspeople
Couples for Christ, a Catholic Charismatic renewal movement which seeks to preserve the sanctity of the family
Congregatio Fratrum Christianorum, Congregation of Christian Brothers
Catholics for Choice, Catholic pro-choice organization

Military 

Combined Forces Command (disambiguation), various multi-national military commands
China Fleet Club, British Navy club in Hong Kong
Canadian Forestry Corps, timber-processing corps of the Canadian Army during both World Wars
Corporal first class, the highest enlistee rank in the Singapore Armed Forces

Entertainment and gaming 

SNK vs. Capcom: Card Fighters Clash,  a game released for the Neo-Geo console
Celebrity Fit Club, a reality weight-loss show

Sports 
Canadian Football Council, precursor of the Canadian Football League

Football clubs 

In England:
(association football)
Chasetown F.C.
Chelsea F.C.
Chester F.C.
Chesterfield F.C.
Chipstead F.C.
Chorley F.C.
Clapton F.C.
Clitheroe F.C.
Cobham F.C.
Cove F.C.
Crockenhill F.C.
Croydon F.C.

In Scotland:
(association football)
Celtic F.C.
Clyde F.C.
Clydebank F.C.
Cowdenbeath F.C.

Other association football:
Carrigans F.C., Philippines
Cebu F.C., Philippines
Ceres F.C., Philippines
Changwon City FC, Korea
Charlotte FC, Charlotte, United States
Chemnitzer FC, Germany 
Chonburi F.C., Thailand
Cincinnati FC, Cincinnati, United States
Cimarron F.C., Philippines
Clermont-Ferrand Football Club, France
Coritiba Foot Ball Club, Brazil
Chattanooga FC, Tennessee, United States

In Australia:
(Australian rules football)
Carlton Football Club
Clarence Football Club
Collingwood Football Club

In India:
(association football)
Chennaiyin FC